Londa Junction railway station (station code: LD) is the primary railway station serving Manjarpai, Londa in Belagavi district of northern Karnataka. The station comes under the jurisdiction of Hubli division of South Western Railways. The station has three platforms. The station is situated on the Miraj - Belgaum - Hubballi line with a branch line towards Vasco Da Gama, Goa.

Originating Trains 
 Miraj - Londa Passenger
 Miraj - Castlerock Express
 Amaravati Express
 Yesvantpur–Vasco da Gama Express
 Vasco da Gama - Yesvantpur Express
 Vasco da Gama–Velankanni Weekly Express
 Vasco–Chennai Express
 Goa Express
 Poorna Express (via )
 Miraj–Castle Rock Express

References

Hubli
Railway junction stations in Karnataka
Railway stations in Belagavi district